Maya Erskine (born May 7, 1987) is an American actress known for her roles as Maggie in Man Seeking Woman and Mikki in Betas. From 2019 to 2021, she starred in Hulu's original TV comedy series PEN15 alongside Anna Konkle; the duo, who co-created and co-executive produced the series, played fictional versions of their 13-year-old selves.

Early life and education
Erskine was born in Los Angeles, the daughter of Mutsuko Nigatawa and jazz drummer Peter Erskine. Her mother is Japanese, from Tokyo, and her father is American, from New Jersey. Her mother also plays the role of her character's mother on PEN15.

Erskine attended Crossroads School for Arts & Sciences and graduated from Los Angeles County High School for the Arts. She then attended New York University's Tisch School of the Arts. Erskine initially studied musical theater but shifted to the school's Experimental Theater Wing. During her time at NYU, she met Anna Konkle while they were both studying abroad at a theater program in Amsterdam.

Career
Erskine has performed with the Los Angeles-based theater groups the East West Players and the Geffen Playhouse. In 2019, she appeared in Amy Poehler's directorial debut, Wine Country, opposite a slate of comedians including Poehler, Maya Rudolph, Tina Fey, and Rachel Dratch.

Personal life
In September 2019, she confirmed her relationship with actor Michael Angarano. On November 2, 2020, the couple revealed they were engaged and expecting a child. Their son, Leon Frederick, was born in 2021.

Filmography

Film

Television

References

External links
 
 
 

Living people
Los Angeles County High School for the Arts alumni
21st-century American actresses
American film actresses
American television actresses
American voice actresses
American film actors of Asian descent
1987 births
American actresses of Japanese descent
Place of birth missing (living people)
21st-century American women writers
21st-century American screenwriters
New York University alumni